The naval Battle of Thurii was fought between Ancient Rome and the Greek colony of Tarentum

Following the battle, Tarentum appealed to Pyrrhus, ruler of Epirus, for military aid. Motivated by his diplomatic obligations to Tarentum, and a personal desire for military accomplishment, Pyrrhus landed a Greek army of some 25,000 men and a contingent of war elephants on Italian soil in 280 BC, where his forces were joined by the Greeks and a portion of the Samnites who revolted against Roman control.

The battle

The Romans had 30,000 men against the small 10,000 men of Tarentum who fought bravely but were overwhelmed by the Romans numbers and the effectiveness of the Roman legion.

References

Battles of the Pyrrhic War
Battles involving city-states of Magna Graecia
Battles involving the Roman Republic